Ornativalva miniscula is a moth of the family Gelechiidae. It was described by Hou-Hun Li and Zhe-Min Zheng in 1995. It is found in Xinjiang, China.

The wingspan is about 11 mm for both males and females.

References

Moths described in 1995
Ornativalva